Ngaygungu people (also known as Ngaygungyi, Ngȋ-koongō-ī or Ngai-kungo-i) are the people from the Atherton, Queensland area who spoke, or whose ancestors once spoke, the Ngaygungu language.

Range
The Ngai-kungo-i were formally identified as a distinct locally indigenous group for Atherton, Queensland by Walter Edmund Roth in October 1898, when he encountered Aboriginal people identifying as Ngai-kungo-i, speaking their own language named Ngai-kungo based in Atherton (which they called Kȃr-kar), and described as having ranged (went "walk-about") up into the Great Dividing Range behind Atherton, crossing the headwaters of the Walsh River (an area they called Balkan) wandering out to the township of Watsonville (an area they called Ilȃnbare).

Material culture
In addition to the Ngai-kungo-i being encountered and identified as having a base in Atherton, Roth also wrote about and collected samples of their material culture, much of which were later purchased from Roth by the Australian Museum.

Citations

Sources

Aboriginal peoples of Queensland
Atherton, Queensland